Susolovo is a rural locality (a village) in Staroselskoye Rural Settlement, Vologodsky District, Vologda Oblast, Russia. The population was 26 as of 2002.

Geography 
Susolovo is located 28 km southwest of Vologda (the district's administrative centre) by road. Sokolnikovo is the nearest rural locality.

References 

Rural localities in Vologodsky District